A padded bloc is a form of protest in which people march in a block formation and wear padding to protect against the police, following the Tute Bianche movement.

See also
 WOMBLES

Protest tactics